Hibiscus grandiflorus, the swamp rosemallow, is a species of flowering plant in the okra family, Malvaceae, that is endemic to the Southeastern United States.

References

fragilis
Flora of the Southeastern United States
Plants described in 1803
Flora without expected TNC conservation status